Marcin Bosak (born 9 September 1979 in Łódź) is a Polish actor. He appeared in more than twenty-five films since 1995.

Biography 
He was born and raised in Łódź. He has a younger sister, Anna, finalist of the You Can Dance: Po prostu tańcz!. He attended the Tadeusz Kościuszko Secondary School No. 3 in Łódź. In 2003, he graduated from Aleksander Zelwerowicz National Academy of Dramatic Art in Warsaw. He was the Polish junior karate champion several times.

He became recognizable as Kamil Gryc, the roommate of Kingi (Katarzyna Cichopek) and Piotr (Marcin Mroczek) Zduński and Magda (Anna Mucha) in the TVP2 M jak miłość series (2003–2006 and again from 2019). He appeared in the music video for the song by Maciej Maleńczuk "Last nocka" (2011) and in the video clip for the Czerwone Świnie band "Parafiańszczyzna" (2019). In 2012, he joined the Studio Theater in Warsaw.

In 2020, he was a participant in the eleventh edition of Polsat entertainment program Dancing with the Stars: Taniec z gwiazdami. In July, he withdrew from further participation in the competition, thus taking the 11th place. 

In the years 2002–2018 he was associated with actress Monika Pikuła, with whom he has two sons: Władysław (born 2008) and Jan (born 2012).

Filmography 
1995: Z piosenką przez Belweder 
1999: Czy można się przysiąść
2003-2006: M jak miłość
2004: The Welts
2006: Just Love Me
2008: Mała wielka miłość
2009: Generał. Zamach na Gibraltarze
2009: Janosik. Prawdziwa historia
2011: In Darkness
2011: 80 Million
2013: Czas honoru
2017: Spoor

References

External links
 

1979 births
Living people
Polish male film actors
Polish male television actors
Actors from Łódź
Aleksander Zelwerowicz National Academy of Dramatic Art in Warsaw alumni
Polish male stage actors